Madurai Junction railway station (station code: MDU) is a railway station in South India and the primary railway station serving the city of Madurai, Tamil Nadu. The station is the headquarters of the Madurai railway division of the Southern Railways and is an A1 graded train station by the Indian Railways for being one of the top 100 booking stations in the country. The second Tejas Express of the country was flagged of by the Prime Minister on 1 March 2019 between Madurai Junction and Chennai Egmore which covers the distance in just 6 hrs 30 mins. It falls under the southern railway zone.

Railway lines

Gallery
Few pictures of this railway station are as follows:-

New rail line proposal
Madurai–Melur–Tirupattur–Karaikudi new BG line: As sanctioned by Railway Board in the year 2007–08, Survey was taken & the report has been submitted to Railway Board on 29 July 2008. Then updating survey was sanctioned in the year 2013–14 and the survey report was submitted to Railway board on 27 November 2014. Railway Board has shelved the proposal at present. Decision of Railway Board is awaited.

References

External links 

 Southern Railways - Official Website

Railway junction stations in Tamil Nadu
Transport in Madurai
Railway stations in Madurai
Railway stations in Madurai district
Railway stations in India opened in 1875
Madurai railway division
1875 establishments in India
Indian Railway A1 Category Stations